Rajarajeswaramudaiya Mahadevar Temple (Sivapuram Sivan Temple) is a Shiva temple located in Sivapuram hamlet in Thiruvallur District of Tamil Nadu, India.

History 
This temple was initially built by Rajaraja Cholan during the 10th century C.E. and later developed by his son Rajendra Chola I.

Deities 
The main deity in the temple is called "Rajarajeswaramudaiya Mahadevar" and also as Theerthapaleeswarar. His consort is Kamakshi Amman.

Rock inscriptions 
The temple walls are full of inscriptions from top to bottom. These inscriptions are of both Rajaraja Chola I and Rajendra Chola I period.

One of the inscriptions gives the various titles of Rajendra Chola I. It also gives the information that he donated 180 goats to the temple for the upkeep of two Nanda lights (lanterns)

This temple is a treasure house for students who wish to research on Tamil inscriptions of the 10th and 11th centuries.

Management 
The temple is managed by the Tamil Nadu department of the Archaeological Survey of India. The temple is maintained in good condition and further development works are being carried out.

Location 
Rajarajeswaramudaiya Mahadevar Temple is located 100 meters from the Sivapuram Bus-Halt on the highway connecting Thiruvallur and Thakkolam.

References

Bibliography 
 Rajarajeswaramudaiya Mahadevar Temple

Additional information 
 Sivapuram Rajarajeswaram (in Tamil-language)
 Sivapuram Sivan Kovil (in Tamil-language)

Hindu temples in Tiruvallur district
Shiva temples in Tiruvallur district